Žiga Kous (born 27 October 1992) is a Slovenian footballer who plays for Mura as a midfielder.

Honours
Mura
Slovenian First League: 2020–21
Slovenian Cup: 2019–20
Slovenian Second League: 2017–18

References

External links
NZS profile 

1992 births
Living people
People from Murska Sobota
Prekmurje Slovenes
Slovenian footballers
Association football midfielders
Association football fullbacks
ND Mura 05 players
NK Domžale players
NK Celje players
NŠ Mura players
Slovenian Second League players
Slovenian PrvaLiga players
Slovenia youth international footballers
Slovenia under-21 international footballers